Christianity is the most widely professed religion in Tanzania, with a substantial Muslim minority. Smaller populations of Animists, practitioners of other faiths, and religiously unaffiliated people are also present.

Current statistics on the relative sizes of various religions in Tanzania are limited because religious questions have been eliminated from government census reports since 1967. A 2020 estimate by Pew Research Center revealed that 63.1% of the population is Christian, 34.1% Muslim, 1.2% practices traditional religions and 1.5% is unaffiliated. However, according to the Association of Religion Data Archives (ARDA), 55.3% of the population is Christian, 31.5% is Muslim, 11.3% practices traditional faiths, while 1.9% of the population is non-religious or adheres to other faiths as of 2020. 

According to a 2015 study, 27.7% of the population was Protestant and 25.6% was Catholic. According to a Pew Research Center study conducted in 2012, 40% of the Muslim population of Tanzania identifies as Sunni,  20% as Shia, and 15% as Ahmadiyya, besides a smaller subset of Ibadism practitioners as well as non-denominational Muslims. The ARDA estimates that most Tanzanian Muslims are Sunni, with a small Shia minority, as of 2020.

Statistics

For many years estimates have been repeated that about a third of the population each follows Islam, Christianity and traditional religions.

Religion-related statistics for Tanzania have been regarded as notoriously biased and unreliable.

About 99 percent of the population in Zanzibar is Muslim. The largest religion in Dar es Salaam is Islam, comprising around 70% of its total population. There are also active communities of other religious groups, primarily on the mainland, such as Buddhists, Hindus, Sikhs, and Bahá'ís.

Abrahamic

Christianity

The Christian population is largely composed of Roman Catholics and Protestants. Among the latter, the large number of Lutherans and Moravians point to the German past of the country while the number of Anglicans point to the British history of Tanganyika. All of them have had some influence in varying degrees from the Walokole movement (East African Revival), which has also been fertile ground for the spread of charismatic and Pentecostal groups.

Islam

On the mainland, Muslim communities are concentrated in coastal areas, with some large Muslim majorities also in inland urban areas especially and along the former caravan routes. 40% of the country's Muslim population is Sunni; the remainder consists of several Shia subgroups (20%), mostly of Indian descent and the Ahmadiyya (15%), and a smaller subset of Ibadism and nondenominational Muslim practitioners.

Bahá'í Faith

Judaism

Indian religions

Buddhism

Hinduism

Hinduism is a minority religion in Tanzania.

Sikhism

Freedom of religion

The government of Tanzania and the semiautonomous government of Zanzibar both recognize religious freedom as a principle and make efforts to protect it. The government of Zanzibar appoints Muslim religious officials in Zanzibar. The main body of law in Tanzania and Zanzibar is secular, but Muslims have the option to use religious courts for family-related cases. Individual cases of religiously motivated violence have occurred against both Christians and Muslims, as well as those accused of witchcraft. The freedom to practice religion is a human right in Tanzania.

Notable places of worship

 Azania Front Lutheran Church – Lutheran
 Christ Church, Zanzibar – Anglican
 Gaddafi Mosque – Islamic
 Great Mosque of Kilwa – Islamic (Historical)
 Ijumaa Mosque – Islamic
 Kizimkazi Mosque – Islamic
 St. Joseph's Cathedral, Dar es Salaam – Catholic

See also
 Religion in Africa
Christian Council of Tanzania

References